Sameli Tala (16 August 1893 – 6 January 1961) was a Finnish track and field athlete. He was born in Jalasjärvi. He competed in the 3000 metres team race at the 1924 Summer Olympics, where the Finnish team won gold medals.

References

External links

1893 births
1961 deaths
People from Jalasjärvi
Finnish male middle-distance runners
Olympic athletes of Finland
Olympic gold medalists for Finland
Athletes (track and field) at the 1924 Summer Olympics
Olympic gold medalists in athletics (track and field)
Medalists at the 1924 Summer Olympics
Sportspeople from South Ostrobothnia